The 2023 Grand National (officially known as the Randox 2023 Grand National for sponsorship reasons) will be the 175th annual running of the Grand National horse race. It is scheduled to take place on Saturday 15 April 2023, at Aintree Racecourse near Liverpool, England. The event will once again be sponsored by Randox Health with Natasha Jonas acting as ambassador.

Entries and weights
The initial entry of 85 horses was published on 7 February 2023. Only 31 of the horses entered are trained in Great Britain, compared to 54 in the initial entry for the 2022 race. Of the Irish-trained runners, 21 are trained by Gordon Elliott, who will be seeking a fourth Grand National victory as a trainer. Bookmakers made 2022 winner Noble Yeats 10-1 favourite at the time of the entries.

Weight for the race were announced on 21 February 2023. Three horses were given the top weight of 11 stones and 12 pounds; Any Second Now (the 2022 runner-up), Conflated and Hewick. Galvin and Noble Yeats were just behind on 11 stone 11, and Noble Yeats remained the betting favourite at a best price of 11-1. Publication of the weights opened up the possibility that the final field will be dominated by Irish-trained runners, with 41 of the top 60 in the weights trained in Ireland.

Nine horses were withdrawn at the acceptance stage on 7 March. Amongst the withdrawals were the 2021 winner Minella Times, who had been retired, and the fourth-placed horse from 2021 Burrows Saint. Iwilldoit was withdrawn having failed to meet the requirements of running in six steeplechases before 19 February. The withdrawals left 73 possible runners remaining with the next acceptance stage due on 28 March.

References

2023
2023 in horse racing
2023 in English sport
21st century in Merseyside
April 2023 sports events in the United Kingdom
Scheduled sports events